Spider-Woman (Martha "Mattie" Franklin) is a fictional superhero appearing in American comic books published by Marvel Comics. She is the third character to be called Spider-Woman.

Publication history
The character first appeared in Spectacular Spider-Man #262 (in the shadows), in November 1998. Her first full appearance was in The Amazing Spider-Man #441 (1998), and her first appearance as Spider-Woman was in The Amazing Spider-Man vol. 2 #5 (1999), the beginning of a three-part crossover which led directly into the launch of her own Spider-Woman series. Like Spider-Woman volume 1, Spider-Woman volume 3 pitted the protagonist against macabre and grotesque villains, and featured a closing story arc in which she looks into a mirror and sees her own face shriveled down to skin and bones. As a running joke, Spider-Woman constantly changes costumes throughout the series, including a four-issue run (#2–5) in which she adopts a new costume every issue. However, sales were mediocre and the series was cancelled with issue #18 (December 2000).

After an almost two-year absence, Mattie Franklin returned for a six-issue story arc in Alias #16–21, but the character spends the entire story (save a three-page epilogue) in a semi-conscious state. The 2007–2008 limited series Loners thus represented Mattie Franklin's first active adventure in more than six years.

Fictional character biography
Martha "Mattie" Franklin is a troubled youth who grew up with her father after her mother died. After overhearing a phone call between her father and Norman Osborn about The Gathering of Five, she takes her father's place during the Gathering and is endowed with the powers that Norman Osborn desired for himself.

During one of Spider-Man's temporary retirements, she wears a near-identical costume and fills in for him. Mattie has long been an obsessive fan of Spider-Man who inspired her career as a superhero. This obsession is coupled with repressed romantic feelings for him, which she revealed during a state of delirium after suffering a head injury in battle. She is defeated by Shadrac, forcing Spider-Man to return to the costume and save her. After Spider-Man's return, she assumes the identity of Spider-Woman. Eventually Charlotte Witter, a villain also going by the name of Spider-Woman, attacks her and steals her powers. Mattie manages not only to reabsorb her own powers, but also to absorb the powers of all three previous Spider-Women. Assisted by Madame Web and Jessica Drew, she hunts down supervillains wherever she can find them.

Lonely from having only her constantly working father to live with, Franklin moves in with J. Jonah Jameson, a close friend of her father, and his wife Marla who happens to be her aunt. They have Franklin (a straight-"A" student) enrolled in a private school, where a classmate, Cheryl, spots her using her powers and becomes her friend and biggest fan. During this time, the powers Mattie absorbed from previous Spider-Women begin returning to their original owners.

She is featured in the series Contest of Champions II. Having escaped from brutal gladitorial fights that other Earth superheroes are unwittingly brainwashed into, she flees into a mysterious jungle and is almost slain by foe and naive friend alike. She ultimately teams up with all original heroes and veterans Iron Man and Psylocke.

Alias
While on a first date, Mattie is slipped a date rape drug. Since by this time she has completely lost the toxin resistance power she absorbed from Jessica Drew, she is rendered senseless. A small-time drug dealer then exploits her to produce a drug called Mutant Growth Hormone, as well as using her for prostitution. In order to keep her prisoner, he regularly doses her with psychoactive drugs. Private investigator Jessica Jones, with the help of Jessica Drew, rescues Mattie and returns her to Jonah and Marla. Mattie goes through counseling in order to get over her dependence on the drugs with which she was sedated.

Loners
After the events of Alias, Mattie had retired from being a superhero and became a private investigator. However, she dons the costume once more to track down the dealers who were selling the MGH, and follows them to Los Angeles, where she attends Excelsior meetings and pretends to quit using her powers. In reality, she is using the meetings to recruit a partner to help her. She is joined by Darkhawk and Ricochet, who keep their activities secret from the rest of the group.

The trio's involvement in the MGH ring bust is revealed when Ricochet's later break-in at a Fujikawa lab results in Lightspeed being grievously wounded by Hollow (formerly Penance). The group is confronted by a woman leading armored guards and Delilah; they have come to reclaim Hollow. The matter is settled peacefully by Mickey Musashi; Mattie is frustrated about allowing the bad guys to leave. However, Mickey reminds her that she is undoing the damage for which she, Darkhawk, and Ricochet are responsible. It is revealed that another reason for her joining the support group was that she was secretly researching the Slingers. While over at Johnny's house she begins searching around, looking for evidence when she is caught by Johnny whom she sleeps with in order for him not to get suspicious. Afterwards, she privately contacts the father of Dusk, in which she confirmed that the former Slinger named Ricochet has no knowledge of Cassie's whereabouts. Mattie and Johnny later arrive at Mickey's apartment, in which they learn about both Phil and Chris fighting each other in Darkhawk armor. After defeating Phil, she learns about Phil also making a deal with Fumiko Fujikawa (just as Mickey did) and decides to leave the support group, no longer trusting them, pointing out that they had forgotten about how to be heroes in trying to overcome their heroic pasts. Mattie also admits that she regrets sleeping with Ricochet.

The Gauntlet and Grim Hunt

While about to help Spider-Man against Lady Stilt-Man she is attacked by Ana Tatiana Kravinoff and captured. She awakens long enough to tell fellow prisoner Madame Web to tell Spider-Man that what happened to her is not his fault and that she did not cry. She is then killed by Sasha Kravinoff as part of a sacrificial ritual to revive her stepson Vladimir Kravinoff. Madame Web expresses a great amount of grief before she is killed, tearfully comforting her and saying she was a fine Spider-Woman who saved lives.

Dead No More: The Clone Conspiracy
During the Dead No More: The Clone Conspiracy storyline, Mattie Franklin was among the people cloned by Ben Reilly posing as Jackal in his company New U Technologies and is seen in the shadows. She attacks Silk after she spies on J. Jonah Jameson at New U Technologies. Silk and Mattie fight on the rooftops of New U Technologies. When Mattie claims that New U Technologies is doing good work and offers to give her a tour if she removes her mask, Silk gets away. Mattie is later seen with J. Jonah Jameson and a cloned Marla Jameson when they visit Cindy Moon and offer her a quick trip to New U Technologies. After Jonah and Marla leave for Marla's treatment, Mattie tells Cindy that she knows Silk's identity and takes her to investigate the facility. Mattie tells her that she has suspicions of the whole experiment as some of the other revived characters have been showing slight behavioral glitches and takes her to a place called "Haven" where they find Hector back in his own body. Mattie helps Silk deal with Hector who reverts to his ghostly form after his cloned body disintegrates. The three head up to the broadcast center where the Carrion Virus quickly spreads due to Marla Jameson opening the doors. Spider-Man and Anna Maria Marconi arrive to stop the broadcast as Mattie reveals to J. Jonah Jameson her superpowers. Silk holds the door back to prevent more infected hosts coming in and Mattie saves her from one of the carriers infecting her and passes out in the process. After Spider-Man sends out the Webware Emergency Signal, J. Jonah Jameson and Silk find Marla and Mattie reduced to dust.

Powers and abilities
Mattie Franklin possessed a variety of superhuman powers. After participating in the Gathering of Five ceremony, Mattie was given the gift of "Power". This granted her superhuman strength on par with Spider-Man's, as well as superhuman speed, agility, stamina and reflexes, and invulnerability. Mattie also gained the power to fly at subsonic speeds.

After a battle with Charlotte Witter, Mattie briefly lost her powers before regaining not only her own powers, but also those of Witter, the two previous Spider Women, Jessica Drew and Julia Carpenter, and Madame Web. This granted her the ability to produce powerful blasts of concentrated bio-electricity, create webbing of psionic energy, grow four "psychic spider legs" from her back, as well as mild telepathic and precognitive powers. Due to her inexperience, Mattie was not able to make full use of the previous Spider Women's abilities.

After a short time, Julia and Jessica regained their powers, which left Mattie with her original abilities and those of Charlotte Witter.

Other versions

MC2
Spider-Man pursued Norman Osborn sooner than he did in the main continuity, and therefore, interfering The Gathering of Five ceremony. Mattie fled with the artifacts needed, and later gained the gift of power.

Spider-Verse
A version of Mattie from an alternate universe makes a brief cameo in the Spider-Verse storyline as part of the Spider-Army.

Marvel Universe vs The Avengers
When a plague turned the world's population into cannibals, Mattie was among the many superheroes who succumbed to it. She was seen battling Black Widow, alongside her infected mentor Jessica Drew.

In other media
 Mattie Franklin's Spider-Woman suit was intended to appear in Marvel: Ultimate Alliance as an alternate skin for Jessica Drew / Spider-Woman. While she was replaced by Spider-Girl, concept art for Mattie is featured as unlockable content.
 Mattie Franklin / Spider-Woman appears as a playable character in Spider-Man Unlimited.

Reception

Comic Book Resources placed her as one of the superheroes Marvel wants you to forget.

References

External links

Mattie's profile at Spiderfan.org
Profile of the MC2 version of the character in the Appendix to the Marvel Handbook
 

Characters created by John Byrne (comics)
Comics characters introduced in 1998
Fictional characters from New York City
Fictional characters with precognition
Marvel Comics characters who can move at superhuman speeds
Incarnations of Spider-Man
Marvel Comics characters with superhuman strength
Marvel Comics female superheroes
Marvel Comics mutates
Marvel Comics telepaths
Spider-Woman